Stenotus is a genus of plant bugs (family Miridae), containing the following species:

Stenotus aureus Linnavuori, 1975
Stenotus binotatus (Fabricius, 1794)
Stenotus bipunctatus Poppius, 1911
Stenotus bivittatus Poppius, 1915
Stenotus brauni Poppius, 1912
Stenotus brevicollis Poppius, 1915
Stenotus brevior Poppius, 1910
Stenotus capensis Poppius, 1912
Stenotus caucasicus Akramovskaya & Kerzhner, 1978
Stenotus chryseis Linnavuori, 1974
Stenotus clypealis Poppius, 1915
Stenotus distinctus Reuter, 1905
Stenotus elegans Poppius, 1912
Stenotus fasciaticollis Reuter, 1905
Stenotus fulvus Poppius, 1912
Stenotus gestroi Poppius, 1912
Stenotus hathor (Kirkaldy, 1902)
Stenotus insularis Poppius, 1915
Stenotus klepsydra Linnavuori, 1974
Stenotus lindiensis Poppius, 1912
Stenotus lineaticollis Poppius, 1914
Stenotus longiceps Poppius, 1915
Stenotus longipennis Reuter, 1905
Stenotus longulus Poppius, 1912
Stenotus marginatus Poppius, 1914
Stenotus niger Poppius, 1914
Stenotus nigroquadristriatus (Kirkaldy, 1902)
Stenotus pallidus (Reuter, 1904)
Stenotus proitos Linnavuori, 1974
Stenotus psole (Kirkaldy, 1902)
Stenotus pulcher Poppius, 1912
Stenotus pusillus Carvalho, Dutra & Becker, 1960
Stenotus pygmaeus Poppius, 1915
Stenotus pylaon (Kirkaldy, 1902)
Stenotus ruber Poppius, 1912
Stenotus rubricatum (Distant, 1904)
Stenotus rubripedes Carvalho, 1953
Stenotus rubrovittatus (Matsumura, 1913)
Stenotus rufescens Poppius, 1910
Stenotus sandaracatus (Distant, 1904)
Stenotus stramineus Poppius, 1915
Stenotus tesquorum Akramovskaya & Kerzhner, 1978
Stenotus transvaalensis (Distant, 1904)
Stenotus typicus (Distant, 1904)
Stenotus viridis (Shiraki, 1913)
Stenotus vitticollis Reuter, 1907

References

Miridae genera
Mirini